Stephen William Pitt (born 1 August 1948) is an English former professional footballer who played for Tottenham Hotspur, Colchester United, Corinthian Casuals and Stevenage Borough .

Playing career
Pitt joined Tottenham Hotspur as an apprentice in August 1965. The winger featured in one match    for the Spurs in a home fixture versus Blackpool on 26 August 1965. Pitt was aged 17 years and 26 days making him one of the youngest Tottenham debutants. He transferred to Colchester United in June 1969 where he played in six senior matches. After leaving Layer Road, Pitt had spells at Corinthian Casuals and Stevenage Borough.

References

External links
 Steve Pitt at Colchester United Archive Database
 Spurs team photo 1966-67

1948 births
Footballers from Willesden
English footballers
English Football League players
Tottenham Hotspur F.C. players
Colchester United F.C. players
Stevenage F.C. players
Living people
Association football wingers
Corinthian-Casuals F.C. players